Ari Vallin (born March 21, 1978) is a Finnish former professional ice hockey defenceman.

In summer 2015, he was transferred from Oulun Kärpät to KooKoo.

In the 2003–2004 SM-liiga playoff finals in Finland against TPS, Vallin was the player who scored the sudden death goal in overtime therefore making the Kärpät team the new champions.

References

External links

1978 births
Living people
Espoo Blues players
Finnish expatriate ice hockey players in Russia
Färjestad BK players
Finnish ice hockey defencemen
Frölunda HC players
HIFK (ice hockey) players
HPK players
Jokerit players
Kiekko-Vantaa players
Kokkolan Hermes players
KooKoo players
KOOVEE players
Lokomotiv Yaroslavl players
Oulun Kärpät players
Rochester Americans players
HC Sparta Praha players
Tappara players
EHC Visp players
People from Ylöjärvi
Sportspeople from Pirkanmaa